Fort Jefferson is an unincorporated community in Darke County, in the U.S. state of Ohio.

History
A post office called Fort Jefferson was established in 1823, and remained in operation until 1906. A memorial to historic Fort Jefferson is located there.

References

Unincorporated communities in Darke County, Ohio
Unincorporated communities in Ohio